"It's Only Love" is the ninth single by Japanese artist Masaharu Fukuyama. It was released on 24 March 1994. It topped the Japanese Oricon chart for four consecutive weeks.

Track listing
It's Only Love
Sorry Baby
It's Only Love (Original karaoke)
Sorry Baby (Original karaoke)

Oricon sales chart (Japan)

References

1994 singles
Masaharu Fukuyama songs
Oricon Weekly number-one singles